Carsten Klee (born 15 September 1970) is a former German footballer.

References

External links 
 

1970 births
Living people
Sportspeople from Jena
People from Bezirk Gera
German footballers
East German footballers
Footballers from Thuringia
Association football forwards
Bundesliga players
2. Bundesliga players
FC Carl Zeiss Jena players
FC Sachsen Leipzig players
FC Hansa Rostock players
FSV Zwickau players
SpVgg Greuther Fürth players
SSV Reutlingen 05 players
DDR-Oberliga players